Trevena may refer to:

Trevena, Cornwall, a village in the UK more widely known as Tintagel
Trevena Inc, a biotechnology company in Pennsylvania, USA

List of people with the surname 

Claire Trevena, a Canadian government minister
John Trevena, a pseudonym used by the Canadian writer Ernest George Henham
Leo Trevena, Australian rugby league footballer and coach

Disambiguation pages with surname-holder lists